Tamworth Borough Council is the local authority for the borough of Tamworth in the county of Staffordshire, England. The council consists of 30 councillors, three for each of the 10 wards in the town. It is currently controlled by the Conservative Party, led by Jeremy Oates. The borough council is based at Marmion House.

History 
Tamworth was an ancient borough. It was reformed under the Municipal Corporations Act 1835 to become a municipal borough. Until 1889 the borough straddled Warwickshire and Staffordshire. When elected county councils were established under the Local Government Act 1888 one provision of the act was that boroughs could no longer straddled county boundaries, as Tamworth did. The town was therefore placed entirely in Staffordshire, as that county had the larger share of the borough's population, with the new Staffordshire County Council providing higher-tier services. On 1 April 1974 the borough became a non-metropolitan district, altering its powers and responsibilities but keeping the same area.

See also 
 Tamworth Borough Council elections

References

Non-metropolitan district councils of England
Local authorities in Staffordshire
Borough Council